Harold Stevens Hopper (November 11, 1912 in Oklahoma City, Oklahoma – November 2, 1970 in Sylmar, California) was an American singer/songwriter, film score composer and screenwriter.

Life
Hopper was a member of The Pied Pipers singing group. He composed the themes tune to several television series such as Judge Roy Bean, Colt .45,  26 Men, Circus Boy and Bearcats!.

He guest starred on the CBS sitcom, Dennis the Menace, starring Jay North in the title role.

Hopper co-authored the script for the 1968 film Shalako, starring Sean Connery.

References

1912 births
1970 deaths
Musicians from Oklahoma City
American male singer-songwriters
American film score composers
American male screenwriters
20th-century American singers
20th-century classical musicians
Singer-songwriters from Oklahoma
Writers from Oklahoma City
Screenwriters from Oklahoma
20th-century American male writers
20th-century American screenwriters
20th-century American male singers